Korakou is a village in the Nicosia District of Cyprus. The hamlet of Agroladou is part of the municipality.

External links
 Official municipality website

References

Communities in Nicosia District